Opus vermiculatum is a method of laying mosaic tesserae to emphasise an outline around a subject.  This can be of one or more rows and may also provide background contrast, e.g. as a shadow, sometimes with opus tessellatum.  The outline created is often light and offset by a dark background for greater contrast.  The name opus vermiculatum literally means "worm-like work", and has been described as one of the most demanding and elaborate forms of mosaic work.  Usually opus vermiculatum is meant to put emphasis on the main design and foreground details of a work, using a smooth and flowing halo-effect. Sometimes it was used only around the head of a figure. The tesserae used were often square but can be variously shaped.

History
 
Opus vermiculatum originated in Greece, later than other mosaic methods.  The earliest known example is the Sophilos Mosaic of Thmuis, which has been dated to around 200 BC.  The method spread throughout the Hellenistic world; for instance, the large corpus of surviving examples found on the island of Delos. In Egypt it was used for tomb decoration from the late-3rd to 1st centuries BC, and in Syria, it survived into later times.  The Nile mosaic of Palestrina has a very refined use of color and shows an advanced development.  This may indicate that the technique was based on paintings.  

In the 1st century BC, it reached Italy along with other mosaic methods.  Many fine examples of this style have been found at Pompeii.  One remarkable work in particular portrays a crucial scene in the Battle of Issus, and was possibly copied from a 4th-century BC Greek painting or fresco.  The use of opus vermiculatum declined after the 1st century AD, but continued to be employed for finer Roman mosaics until the 4th century.  By then, mosaics were becoming increasingly impressionistic, taking advantage of the crystalline reflection of the tesserae, which was better suited to opus tessellatum.  It was eventually entirely abandoned for this style.

See also
Vermiculation

Notes

Mosaic
Italian mosaic
Roman mosaics